Konstantin Danil (1798-1873) was a Serbian painter of the 19th century. He is most famous for his portraits and religious painting. Danil is considered to be the most important Serbian painter of Biedermeier.

Biography 
According to Felix Kanitz he was born to a Serbian family as Danilo Petrović. Other sources state that his origin and birthplace is unclear. He was born either in Lugoj or Ečka. At the age of thirteen he left Lugoj for Timișoara, where he executed a drawing which procured his admission to the school of Arsenije Teodorović. Teodorović was a principal of a drawing school, and through it he influenced a whole new generation of younger artists, including a few that rivaled him. One of them was Konstantin Danil. Here Konstantin Danil studied for several years, and produced, among other works, a figure of Saint Sava which attracted much attention. The Serbian master gave every encouragement to the young Konstantin Danil for the next four years. Artists had then already started to call Konstantin Danil Grigorović, who was perpetually sketching all sorts of objects in art and in nature, by his father's name Danil. Konstantin Danil, who had by this time acquired so much mastery over the painting technique that his performances were barely distinguishable from Teodorović's own.

At the age of seventeen, he left Teodorović and went to the atelier of one of three Viennese academicians, then working in Temișvar. Danil also took lessons from itinerant portrait-painters and afterward entered as a student in the Academy of Arts in Vienna and in Munich. It was in Vienna and Munich, where he became influenced for a while by the works of classicist German painters Asmus Jacob Carstens, Joachim Christian Reinhart, Peter Fendi, Joseph Anton Koch, Gottlieb Schick and Bonaventura Genelli. He also took time to travel and paint throughout Banat and Erdelj (Transylvania). Danil had tried his skill in every genre, including portraiture, landscape, flower-painting, scenes of modern life and figure subjects. From Munich, Danil returned to Veliki Bečkerek (modern-day Zrenjanin), where he resumed the style of Teodorović, and shortly afterward Veliki Bečkerek became his permanent residence.

He married German noblewoman Sofia Dely in 1827. Danil painted local nobelman Karacsony, and when Karacsony became a Viceroy of Banat, Danil's popularity grew.

Having spent much time in the military frontier, and having been with the Austrian troops in actual warfare, he made a specialty of rendering the Military Frontier officers and border men. At the same time, he produced a series of designs illustrative of Old Testament history.

From 1834 to 1873 Danil threw himself into the Biedermeier and the sacral painting based on the school of Vienna Nazarene movement, and became one of its regional leaders. He worked in his own atelier at 37 Tsar Dušan Street in Veliki Bečkerek where numerous Serbian artists were apprenticed, including poet-painter Đura Jakšić and artist Lazar Nikolić, who wrote a biography of his teacher.

Danil was a Serbian Orthodox Christian. In 1872 his wife, Sofia Dely, died, and a year later (1873), Danil died in Veliki Bečkerek (Zrenjanin) on 13 May.

Work 

His chief pictures are Madonna, Male Portrait, Still Life, Stanci Dely (his father-in-law), Archangel Gabriel, Ms Vaigling, Ms Tetesi, and, best known of all, General Stevan Kničanin and Portrait of Maria (1872). The portraits of his wife Sofia Dely (1840), Petar Jagodić, and A Lady with a Cross are among his best achievements in this class. Danil painted a number of portraits of the wealthe Jagodić family.

Portrait of Captain Kljunović and his wife impressed a Serbian Orthodox priest by the name of Arsenović, who selected Danil to decorate the walls, dome and iconostasis of a new Serbian Orthodox church in Pančevo with figures of saints. Upon completion of his commission (iconostasis) in 1833 Danil received an honorarium of 4,000 silver florins. Iconostases painted by Danil can also be found in Timișoara, Uzdin, Dobrica and Jarkovac.

Public collections 
His work can be found in the following public collections:

 National Museum of Serbia
 Gallery of Matica Srpska
 Timișoara Art Museum
 National Museum of Pančevo
 National Museum of Zrenjanin
 A lot of his work used to be found in private collections.

Legacy 
Danil is remembered as a master of technique, and his portraits reveal an extraordinary study into the characters of his subjects. Nevertheless, for some time after his death his name was almost forgotten by the public, and it is only in the twentieth century that he has been conceded the position among the masters of the modern Serbian school which is his due.

On the basis of his early art work in Temișvar, Konstantin Danil is also claimed by three other nations, Romania, Austria and Hungary.

He is included in The 100 most prominent Serbs.

Gallery

See also 
 List of Serbian painters

References

Further reading
 Euphrosine, Nemzeti Újság, 1840
 Pesti Hirlap, Temesvarer Wochenblatt (1841), 45, 1845. 49);
 Lazar Nikolić, Srpski slikari, 1895
 Dr. István Berkeszi, Temišvarski slikari, 1909
 Sendrej-Sentivany, Leksikon ugarskih likovnih umjetnika, 1915
 
 Adrian Negru, Constantin Daniel, Libertatea, Panciova;, 1996
 Adrijan Negru, Slikarske radionice u Banatu u XVIII i XIX veku, Viša škola za obrazovanje vaspitača, Vršac, 2003

External links

 Terminartors.com
 
 Portrait of Petar Jagodic

1802 births
1873 deaths
Serbian painters
19th-century Serbian painters
Serbian male painters
Biedermeier painters
People from Lugoj
19th-century Serbian male artists